Marcin Janusz Sobala (born 10 August 1972) is a Polish fencer. He competed in the individual and team sabre events at the 2000 Summer Olympics. He won a silver medal at the 1999 World Fencing Championships in the team sabre event.

References

External links
 

1972 births
Living people
Polish male fencers
Olympic fencers of Poland
Fencers at the 2000 Summer Olympics
Fencers from Warsaw